The hippodrome  was an ancient Greek stadium for horse racing and chariot racing. The name is derived from the Greek words hippos (ἵππος; "horse") and dromos (δρόμος; "course"). The term is used in the modern French language and some others, with the meaning of "horse racecourse". Hence, some present-day horse-racing tracks also include the word "hippodrome" in their names, such as the Hippodrome de Vincennes and the Central Moscow Hippodrome. In the English-speaking world the term is occasionally used for theatres.

Overview
The Roman version, the circus was similar to the Greek hippodrome. (The hippodrome was not a Roman amphitheatre, which was used for spectator sports, executions, and displays, or a Greek or Roman semicircular amphitheater used for theatrical performances.)

The Greek hippodrome was usually set out on the slope of a hill, and the ground taken from one side served to form the embankment on the other side. One end of the hippodrome was semicircular, and the other end square with an extensive portico, in front of which, at a lower level, were the stalls for the horses and chariots. At both ends of the hippodrome were posts (Greek termata) that the chariots turned around. This was the most dangerous part of the track, and the Greeks put an altar to Taraxippus (disturber of horses) there to show the spot where many chariots wrecked.

Οne large ancient hippodrome was the Hippodrome of Constantinople, built between AD 203 and 330.

in the English-speaking world Hippodrome is occasionally used in the names of theatres, after the Hippodrome which opened in London in 1900 "combining circus, hippodrome, and stage performances".

In the 20th Century, the term Aerodrome was created, modeled on Hippodrome.

List of Greek hippodromes
 Delos
 Delphi
 Isthmia
 Lageion
 Mount Lykaion
 Nemea
 Olympia

List of Roman hippodromes
 Aphrodisias
 Caesarea Maritima
 Gerasa
 Hippodrome of Berytus
 Hippodrome of Constantinople
 Hippodrome of Thessalonica
 Tyre Hippodrome
 Miróbriga (Mirobriga Celticorum)
 Roman circus of Mérida
 Roman Stadium of Philippopolis

List of modern horse-racing venues

See also
Other structures called hippodromes:
 Hippodrome du parc de Beyrouth
 Kensington Hippodrome
 Madison Square Garden (1879). It is known as the "Great Roman Hippodrome"
 New York Hippodrome Theatre
 Brighton Hippodrome Entertainment venue in the ancient centre of Brighton
 Birmingham Hippodrome Theatre
 Bristol Hippodrome Theatre
 Hulme Hippodrome Theatre in Hulme, Manchester
 Hippodrome Theatre (Baltimore), or the France-Merrick Performing Arts Center
 Hippodrome Theater (Richmond, Virginia)
Similar modern structures:
 Velodrome
 Oval track
 Dragstrip

References 

<ref>“Hippodrome of Constantinople.” Hippodrome Of Constantinople - Istanbul Tour Studio – Istanbul Guide, https://istanbultourstudio.com/things-to-do/hippodrome-of-constantinople./ref>

 
Ancient chariot racing
Ancient Greek buildings and structures
Sport in ancient Greece
Sports venues by type
Harness racing